The 1959 NCAA College Division football rankings are from the United Press International poll of College Division head coaches. The 1959 NCAA College Division football season was the second year UPI published a poll in what was termed the "small college" division. The Associated Press did not start their version of the poll until 1960. The Top 10 included the team's record while the "Second 10" did not.

Legend

The UPI coaches poll

References

Rankings
NCAA College Division football rankings